Sidney Rand may refer to:
 Sidney Rand (rower)
 Sidney Rand (ambassador)